Strange Shadows in an Empty Room is a 1976 film starring Stuart Whitman as a tough Dirty Harry type who sets out to discover his sister's killer.

Plot
A tough cop learns that his sister was poisoned, and puts the alleged murderer in jail. Later he begins to doubt the suspect was the guilty party, and sets out to discover the real killer.

Cast

 Stuart Whitman as Tony Saitta
 John Saxon as  Ned Matthews
 Martin Landau as George Tracer
 Gayle Hunnicutt as Margie Cohn
 Tisa Farrow as  Julie Foster
 Carole Laure as  Louise Saitta
 Jean LeClerc as  Fred
 Anthony Forrest as  Robert Tracer
 Jean Marchand as  Terence
  Jerome Tiberghien as  Ted Sullivan

Production
Strange Shadows in an Empty Room was shot in Ottawa, Ontario and Montreal, Quebec in Canada. Director Alberto de Martino stated that Stuart Whitman agreed to do the film to have work outside of Hollywood. For the car chase in the film, de Martino did not use storyboards, stating he can't draw and was more influenced by his love of jazz music, starting in the background and improvising as he went along.

Style
Roberto Curti describes the film as "essentially a whodunnit of sorts, with the inclusion of the odd [Dario] Argento-like detail". He also notes that film has "very little to do with Italian poliziotteschi of the period".

Release
Strange Shadows in an Empty Room was released in Italy on March 9, 1976, where it was distributed by Fida. The film has been released with different titles in other English-speaking countries such as Blazing Magnum in the United Kingdom. Director De Martino stated that the film was based on an old story he had, titled D come Delitto (M for Murder) which he re-arranged slightly.  After finishing it, a producer for the film sent a telegram to De Martino, which he claims it stated that "It's got nothing to envy in any American film."

Reception
In a retrospective review, AllMovie stated that the film has "plenty of slick visuals and action but makes little sense: The script is a chaotic jumble of half-baked mystery" and that it is "never convincing or believable for a second and is further hurt by a lack of sympathetic characters". The review concluded that Strange Shadows in an Empty Room can only be recommended to hardcore Eurotrash buffs."

References

Footnotes

Sources

External links

1976 films
Panamanian drama films
Films shot in Ottawa
Films shot in Montreal
Films set in Montreal
1970s Italian-language films
English-language Italian films
English-language Panamanian films
Films directed by Alberto De Martino
Films scored by Armando Trovajoli
1976 crime films
Italian auto racing films
1970s Italian films